is a city in Kanagawa Prefecture, Japan. , the city has an estimated population of 723,470, with 334,812 households, and a population density of 1,220 persons per km2. Sagamihara is the third-most-populous city in the prefecture, after Yokohama and Kawasaki, and the fifth most populous suburb of the Greater Tokyo Area. Its northern neighbor is Machida, with which a cross-prefectural merger has been proposed.

On April 1, 2010, the city became the 19th city designated by government ordinance. As a result of this, three wards were established: Midori-ku, Chūō-ku and Minami-ku.

Geography
Sagamihara covers a large area of northwestern Kanagawa Prefecture. The main areas of commercial activity in Sagamihara are located near Hashimoto Station on the JR East Yokohama Line and Keio Sagamihara Line; Sagamihara Station on the Yokohama Line; and Sagami-Ōno Station on the Odakyu Odawara Line. Western Sagamihara is within the Tanzawa Mountains.

Wards
 Midori-ku
 Chūō-ku – administrative center
 Minami-ku

Surrounding municipalities
Kanagawa Prefecture
Zama
Yamato
Atsugi
Aikawa
Kiyokawa
Yamakita
Tokyo
Machida
Hachioji
Hinohara
Yamanashi Prefecture
Uenohara
Dōshi

Climate
Sagamihara has a Humid subtropical climate (Köppen Cfa) characterized by warm summers and cool winters with light to no snowfall.  The average annual temperature in Sagamihara is 12.6 °C. The average annual rainfall is 1906 mm with September as the wettest month. The temperatures are highest on average in August, at around 23.9 °C, and lowest in January, at around 1.2 °C.

Demographics
Per Japanese census data, the population of Sagamihara has grown steadily over the past 70 years.

History
The area of modern Sagamihara has been settled since ancient times, and has a number of remains from the Japanese Paleolithic period and Kofun period have been found. It was home to the Yokoyama clan, one of the seven warrior clans of the Musashi region during the early Kamakura period. During the Edo period, the lands around Sagamihara were tenryō territory theoretically administered directly by the Tokugawa Shogunate in Edo; however, in reality, the area was a patchwork of small fiefs held by various hatamoto, as well as exclaves under the control of the Ogino-Yamanaka Domain and Karasuyama Domain.

After the Meiji Restoration, the eastern portion was part of Kōza District, and the western portion was part of Tsukui District. The Kōza District portion was administratively divided into six villages on April 1, 1889 with the creation of the modern municipalities system. The area was the location of extensive training facilities and arsenals of the Imperial Japanese Army during the 1930s. These villages were merged on April 29, 1941, together with neighboring Zama Town to create Sagamihara Town. At the time of its formation, it was the largest town in Japan in terms of area.

On September 1, 1948, Zama was administratively separated into Zama Town. The remaining portion became Sagamihara City on November 20, 1954. The city population had grown steadily, partly due to local industrial development, and partly due to the city's excellent transportation infrastructure connecting it to Yokohama, Tokyo and Hachiōji. It was designated a core city with increased autonomy in 2003.

On March 20, 2006, Sagamihara absorbed the towns of Tsukui and Sagamiko (both from Tsukui District). The merged city consisted of two geographically separate areas, as two other towns of Tsukui District (Fujino and Shiroyama) elected to remain separate. A further merger on March 11, 2007, joined Fujino and Shiroyama with Sagamihara, thus geographically unifying the city, and dissolving former Tsukui District. In 2007, the population of Sagamihara exceeded 700,000. In 2010, Sagamihara was redesignated as a government ordinance city and split into three wards Midori-ku, Chūō-ku, and Minami-ku.

On July 25, 2016, 19 people were killed and 26 injured in a mass stabbing incident at a disabled care home in the city by Satoshi Uematsu, the perpetrator.

Government
Sagamihara has a mayor-council form of government with a directly elected mayor and a unicameral city council of 49 members. Sagamihara contributes eight members to the Kanagawa Prefectural Assembly. In terms of national politics, the city is divided between the Kanagawa 14th district and Kanagawa 16th district of the lower house of the Diet of Japan.

Economy
In terms of economy and geography such as railroads and roads, Sagamihara has stronger ties with Tokyo than other cities in the prefecture, especially with the Tama area such as Machida and Hachioji. In addition, it is positioned by the national government as the core of the southwestern part of the Tokyo metropolitan area. However, due to the successive withdrawal of large factories in the city, the aspect of Sagimahara as a commuter town has become stronger, and the percentage of commuters to work and school in Tokyo in 2015 was 24.6%.

Education
Azabu University
Sagami Women's University
Izumi Junior College
 Sagamihara has 13 public high schools and one combined middle/high school operated by the Kanagawa Prefectural Board of Education, and the prefecture also operates two special education schools for the handicapped. There are also two private high schools.

Transportation

Railway
 JR East – Yokohama Line
 –  –  –  – 
 JR East – Sagami Line
  –  –  –  –  –  – Hashimoto
 JR East – Chūō Main Line
 – 
 Odakyu Electric Railway – Odakyu Odawara Line
 –  – 
 Keio Corporation – Sagamihara Line
 Hashimoto

Highways

Local attractions
 Lake Sagami
 , built in 1598
 Sagamihara Prefectural Park

Sports
Mitsubishi Sagamihara DynaBoars
SC Sagamihara

Sister cities
 Toronto, Ontario, Canada since January 1, 1998
 Trail, British Columbia, Canada, since April 15, 1991
 Wuxi, Jiangsu, China, since October 6, 1985

Notable people from Sagamihara
 Jin Akimoto, retired mixed martial artist
 Jiro Akama, politician
 Hiroko Anzai, actress, model and gravure idol
 Hayato Arakaki, professional baseball pitcher and player (Hokkaido Nippon-Ham Fighters, Nippon Professional Baseball – Pacific League)
 Akira Asahara, professional Magic: The Gathering player
 Nana Eikura, model, actress, and radio show host
 Tsuneo Enari, photographer
 Masato Fukae, professional baseball outfielder
 Tatsunori Hara, baseball manager (Yomiuri Giants, Nippon Professional Baseball)
 Tasuku Hatanaka, actor, voice actor and singer
 Yūki Himura, comedian, actor and voice actor
 Akiko Ichikawa, Japanese American interdisciplinary artist, editor, writer and activist
 Akira Iida, Super GT racing driver
 Yu Inaba, actor (Kamen Rider Drive)
 Megumi Inoue, sport shooter
 Yōzaburō Kanari, manga story writer (Kindaichi Case Files)
 Tsutomu Kashiwakura, voice actor and sound director
 Ukyo Katayama, former Formula One driver and team manager
 Tsuyoshi Kawagishi, former Nippon Professional Baseball pitcher (Tohoku Rakuten Golden Eagles, Pacific League)
 Hidetaka Kawagoe, former Nippon Professional Baseball pitcher
 Tsuyoshi Kikuchihara, former baseball player
 Yuna Kotani, female curler
 Keiichiro Koyama, musician, leader of NEWS
 Tomoyoshi Koyama, professional motorcycle road racer
 Togi Makabe, professional wrestler (New Japan Pro-Wrestling)
 Ayako Nishikawa, female TV star, tarento, comedian, and cosmetic surgeon
 Hiroyuki Nishimura, internet entrepreneur, self-help author and TV personality
 Yukio Ozaki, politician
 Kenji Ozawa, world-famous conductor
 Ryo Aitaka, heavyweight kickboxer
 Makoto Sasamoto, Greco-Roman wrestler
 Shin'ya Satō, professional shogi player ranked 7-dan
 Ryōichi Sekiya, ultramarathon and marathon runner
 Shinya Tasaki, sommelier
 Ai Tominaga, fashion model and actress
 Yuki Tsunoda, Formula One racing driver
 Momo Watanabe, professional wrestler (World Wonder Ring Stardom)
 Yuuya Watanabe, professional Magic: The Gathering player
 Mika Yoshikawa, middle- and long-distance runner
 Mai Murakami, Olympic gymnast
 Plaek Phibunsongkhram, former Thai Prime Minister died here in exile.

References

External links

Official Website 

 
Cities in Kanagawa Prefecture
Cities designated by government ordinance of Japan